York Historic District in York, South Carolina is a historic district that was listed on the National Register of Historic Places in 1979.

The district includes Hart House and Wilson House, which are both separately listed on the NRHP.

References

Historic districts on the National Register of Historic Places in South Carolina
Gothic Revival architecture in South Carolina
Neoclassical architecture in South Carolina
Buildings and structures in York County, South Carolina
National Register of Historic Places in York County, South Carolina